Olivença may refer to:

 The Portuguese name of the town of Olivenza, a town situated on a disputed section of the Portugal–Spain border and administered de facto by Spain
 Capunda Cavilongo, a town in Angola, called Olivença-a-Nova during the colonial period
 Olivença, Alagoas, a municipality in the state of Alagoas in Brazil
 São Paulo de Olivença, a municipality in the state of Amazonas in Brazil